Pádraig Flynn (born 9 May 1939) is a former Irish Fianna Fáil politician who served as European Commissioner for Social Affairs from 1993 to 1999, Minister for Industry and Commerce and Minister for Justice from 1992 to 1993, Minister for the Environment from 1987 to 1991, Minister for Trade, Commerce and Tourism from October 1982 to December 1982, Minister for the Gaeltacht from March 1982 to October 1982 and Minister of State at the Department of Transport from 1980 to 1981. He served as a Teachta Dála (TD) for the Mayo West constituency from 1977 to 1994.

Early life
Flynn was born in Castlebar, County Mayo, in 1939. He is the son of Patrick and Anne Flynn. He was educated in St. Gerald's College, Castlebar and qualified as a primary school teacher from St Patrick's College of Education in Dublin. His mother owned a small shop in Castlebar. He was married in 1963, to Dorothy and they have four children, one son and three daughters. One daughter, Beverley Flynn was also a Fianna Fáil politician.

He first held political office in 1967, when he became a member of Mayo County Council. Ten years later, at the 1977 general election, he was elected to Dáil Éireann as a Fianna Fáil TD for the Mayo West constituency. On the day the 21st Dail convened in Leinster House, Frank Dunlop described Flynn's encounter with the then Taoiseach Jack Lynch:

Ministerial career
Flynn was a supporter of Charles Haughey in the 1979 Fianna Fáil leadership contest. His loyalty was rewarded when he became a Minister of State at the Department of Transport and Power. Flynn joined the Cabinet for the first time following the February 1982 general election, when he was appointed Minister for the Gaeltacht. In October 1982, in a minor reshuffle, he became Minister for Trade, Commerce and Tourism. However, his time in this office was brief, since Fianna Fáil lost the November 1982 general election.

Fianna Fáil was returned to power in the 1987 general election and Flynn became Minister for the Environment. Two years later he opposed the formation of the coalition government with the Progressive Democrats, describing it "as hitting at Fianna Fáil core values." In 1990, he attacked the opposition presidential candidate Mary Robinson on a radio show, accusing her of "having a new-found interest in her family" for the purposes of her election campaign. This attack backfired drastically, causing many women who initially supported Lenihan to back Robinson. Lenihan's campaign never recovered, and Robinson became Ireland's first female President.

In 1991, Flynn was sacked from the Cabinet because of his support for a motion of no confidence in the Taoiseach, Charles Haughey. Then in 1992, Albert Reynolds became Taoiseach and Flynn was rewarded for supporting Reynolds by becoming Minister for Justice. In 1993, he retired from domestic politics when he was appointed Ireland's European Commissioner. He was reappointed by the Fine Gael-Labour Party government in 1995 and, on both of these occasions, served in the social affairs portfolio.

The Late Late Show controversy
On 15 January 1999, Flynn made comments on a live chat show (The Late Late Show) regarding businessman Tom Gilmartin and a donation of IR£50,000 to the Fianna Fáil party. On the same programme, following a question by journalist Barry O'Halloran on EC Commissioners' remuneration, Flynn described his salary and lifestyle as a European Union Commissioner as being "about IR£140,000, paying 33% tax, which works out to IR£100,000 net. [...] It's a well-paid job." He said the position meant he had the added expense of  maintaining three houses, cars, and housekeepers and regular travel, and described the hassle involved. The performance was seen as eccentric and out of touch at a time when house prices were rising significantly.

The show's presenter Gay Byrne then asked Flynn if he knew of Gilmartin. Flynn responded that he knew him well. Flynn seemed to be making an attack of Gilmartin's emotional stability, based on the effect of sickness of Gilmartin's wife. If it was to be interpreted as an attack of Gilmartin's credibility, then it backfired in a spectacular manner against Flynn. Also, unknown to Flynn, Gilmartin was watching The Late Late Show on Tara Television at his home in Luton. This hurt Gilmartin a great deal, while also bringing the illness of his wife into the picture as the real driving force behind Gilmartin's testimony against Flynn. Gilmartin responded by releasing details of meetings he held with Flynn to the McCracken Tribunal.

The interview is widely described as the end of Flynn's political career.

Retirement from politics
Flynn's second term as European Commissioner ended early in September 1999, when the entire commission resigned due to allegations of malpractice by the European Parliament. He was not reappointed to the commission and retired from politics completely. He is a member of the Comite d'Honneur of the Institute of International and European Affairs. Flynn's daughter Beverley Flynn is a former Fianna Fáil TD for the Mayo constituency. She was readmitted to the party on 8 April 2008, having previously been expelled after failing in a libel action against RTÉ which claimed she was involved in selling bogus non-resident accounts to customers while she worked for National Irish Bank.

He receives annual pension payments of €87,129 from his time as a TD and Minister, but this does not include payments for his time as a European Commissioner.

Mahon Tribunal report
Flynn was cited in the Mahon Tribunal for having received money from Frank Dunlop intended for Fianna Fáil, but diverted to Flynn's personal use. On 22 March 2012, the final report of the Mahon Tribunal was published. It found that Flynn "wrongly and corruptly" sought a substantial donation from Tom Gilmartin for the Fianna Fáil party. It also found that having been paid IR£50,000 by Gilmartin, for that purpose, Flynn proceeded to use that money for his personal benefit, and that the donation funded at least a significant portion of the purchase of a farm in County Mayo.

Flynn made his first public appearance since the publication of the Mahon Report by attending noon Mass in the Holy Rosary Church in Castlebar.

Resignation from Fianna Fáil
On 26 March 2012, facing expulsion following the Mahon Tribunal, Flynn resigned in disgrace from Fianna Fáil before he could be ousted.

See also
 Deposit interest retention tax (DIRT)

References

1939 births
Living people
Fianna Fáil TDs
Institute of European Affairs
Irish European Commissioners
Members of the 21st Dáil
Members of the 22nd Dáil
Members of the 23rd Dáil
Members of the 24th Dáil
Members of the 25th Dáil
Members of the 26th Dáil
Members of the 27th Dáil
Local councillors in County Mayo
Politicians from County Mayo
Ministers for Justice (Ireland)
People from Castlebar
Ministers of State of the 21st Dáil
Alumni of St Patrick's College, Dublin
Ministers for the Environment (Ireland)
European Commissioners 1993–1994
European Commissioners 1995–1999
People educated at St Gerald's College, Castlebar
Ministers for Enterprise, Trade and Employment